Nikola Jelišić (born 29 December 1994) is a Bosnian-German professional footballer.

Club career
Jelišić made his professional debut for Blau-Weiß Linz in the Austrian 2. Liga on 16 August 2019, coming on as a substitute in the 72nd minute for Aleksandar Kostić against Austria Wien II. Seven minutes later, he assisted Martin Kreuzriegler's headed goal to secure a 4–3 home win for Blau-Weiß Linz.

International career
Jelišić received citizenship for Bosnia and Herzegovina in 2015 from the Council of Ministers, and was therefore eligible to represent the country internationally. He made four appearances for the under-21 national team in 2015, and scored one goal.

Managerial career
On 11 October 2022, Jelišić was appointed new head coach of FC Pipinsried after former coach Miljan Prijovic was dismissed. He also continued as a player of the club.

Personal life
Jelišić's younger brother, Daniel, is also a footballer.

References

External links
 
 
 
 

1994 births
Living people
Footballers from Munich
German people of Bosnia and Herzegovina descent
Citizens of Bosnia and Herzegovina through descent
German people of Serbian descent
Association football midfielders
Bosnia and Herzegovina footballers
Bosnia and Herzegovina under-21 international footballers
German footballers
FC Bayern Munich II players
BV Cloppenburg players
1. FC Schweinfurt 05 players
FC Blau-Weiß Linz players
FC Pipinsried players
Regionalliga players
2. Liga (Austria) players
German expatriate footballers
Bosnia and Herzegovina expatriate footballers
Expatriate footballers in Austria
Bosnia and Herzegovina expatriate sportspeople in Austria
German expatriate sportspeople in Austria
German football managers
Bosnia and Herzegovina football managers
Regionalliga managers